Hittisleigh is a small rural parish and village just north-east of Dartmoor in Devon. Once part of the ancient district of the Wonford Hundred, it is now administered by Mid Devon District Council and part of the Central Devon constituency. The name Hittisleigh may be derived from Hyttin's leah (from the Old English for wood/clearing). Alternatively it may come from the Old English "hithisce" (a family or tenants) and have meant 'tenant's place or pasture'. Although difficult to date the initial settlement Hittisleigh is mentioned in the Domesday Book. Hittisleigh is known as the birthplace of Samuel Bellamy the eighteenth-century pirate.

It has a church, Church of St Andrew, Hittisleigh, village hall, several farms and a public telephone box. In the past it has also boasted a school, public house (The Hunters Inn), post office, blacksmith, bakery and Wesleyan Methodist chapel. These have all since closed with the buildings often becoming residential. The church has a nave and chancel of the 14th century and a 15th-century aisle built of granite. According to John Betjeman, "it was restored late and lovingly" and is "an adorable little church".

The village is served by a bus from Whiddon Down to Crediton on a Tuesday (it returns if required by passengers on the bus).

References

External links

Villages in Devon